Krasny is a rural locality (a settlement) and the administrative center of Oktyabrvskoye Rural Settlement, Bobrovsky District, Voronezh Oblast, Russia. The population was 417 as of 2010. Morozovka is the nearest rural locality.

References 

Rural localities in Bobrovsky District